Hari Kishore Singh was an Indian politician. He was elected to the Lok Sabha, lower house of the Parliament of India from Sheohar, Bihar as a member of the Janata Dal. He was the Minister of State for External Affairs in the V.P. Singh administration.

References

External links
Official biographical sketch in Lok Sabha website

Janata Dal politicians
India MPs 1971–1977
India MPs 1989–1991
India MPs 1991–1996
1934 births
Lok Sabha members from Bihar
Ministers for External Affairs of India
2013 deaths